Yunganastes is a small genus of frogs in the family Strabomantidae found in southern Peru and central to northern Bolivia. They were formerly placed in the genus Eleutherodactylus as the "Eleutherodactylus fraudator group", subsequently moved to Pristimantis, before becoming recognized as a separate subgenus, and finally, a genus. Its sister taxon is the genus Pristimantis. Yunganastes are endemic to the cloud forests and humid montane forests of the Cordillera Oriental of the Andes in Bolivia and southern Peru.

Etymology
The generic name Yunganastes is derived from yunga, the humid forests of the Andean valleys, and the Greek nastes for "dweller". This refers to the typical habitat of frogs in this genus.

Description
Yunganastes are robust-bodied and moderate to medium-sized frogs. Males can reach  and females  in snout–vent length. The limbs are moderately long. The head is as wide or wider than the body; the snout is short. The tympanum is visible, and the supra-tympanic fold is well-developed. The toes have rudimentary or no webbing. Males have a large vocal sac. The male advertisement call is single melodic whistle with frequency modulation and relatively low dominant frequency of about 1200–1500 Hz.

Species
There are five species:
 Yunganastes ashkapara (Köhler, 2000)
 Yunganastes bisignatus (Werner, 1899)
 Yunganastes fraudator (Lynch and McDiarmid, 1987)
 Yunganastes mercedesae (Lynch and McDiarmid, 1987)
 Yunganastes pluvicanorus (De la Riva and Lynch, 1997)

References

 
Amphibians of South America
Amphibian genera
Taxa named by Santiago Castroviejo-Fisher
Taxa named by José Manuel Padial
Taxa named by Ignacio J. De la Riva
Taxa named by Jörn Köhler